The Colorado State Rams baseball team represented Colorado State University in college baseball from 1900 through the program's dissolution in 1992.  The program reached the College World Series once, in 1950.

Head coaches

Facilities
Durkee Field (1900–1911)
Colorado Field (1912–1967)

References

 
1900 establishments in Colorado
1992 disestablishments in Colorado